Brendan O'Connell (born May 19, 1951) is an Irish sprint canoer who competed in the early to mid-1970s. Competing in two Summer Olympics, he was eliminated in the repechages of all three events he competed (1972: K-2 1000 m, 1976: K-2 500 m, K-4 1000 m). He later became the President of the Irish Canoe Union.

References

External links
 
 Sports-reference.com profile

1951 births
Canoeists at the 1972 Summer Olympics
Canoeists at the 1976 Summer Olympics
Irish male canoeists
Living people
Olympic canoeists of Ireland